Hylaea may refer to any of these subjects:

 Hylaea (geography), a country visited by Heracles where he found the monster Echidna
 Hylaea (literature), a Ukrainian Futurist literary group
 Hylaea (moth), a genus of moths in the family Geometridae
 Hylaea (plant), a genus of plants in the subfamily Apocynoideae